De besejrede Pebersvende  is a 1914 Danish silent film directed by Lau Lauritzen Sr.

Cast
Oscar Stribolt - Dam, pebersvend
Frederik Buch - Brik, pebersvend
Carl Schenstrøm - Spill, pebersvend
Franz Skondrup - Glud, nygift
Ellen Kornbeck - Betty Glud, nygift

External links
Danish Film Institute

1914 films
Danish silent films
Films directed by Lau Lauritzen Sr.
Nordisk Film films
Danish black-and-white films